The surname LeCaptain is derived from Lecapitaine, which comes from the name of Capet, the Capetian King of the Capetian Dynasty, meaning "to head or lead." Captain, LeCaptain, or Lecapitaine, according to Webster's Dictionary also means "King" or "Prince."

In the last 300 years, the name Captain or LeCaptain has mainly been used as a military term describing a position of a military leader.

Hugh Capet was the first King of the Franks of the House of Capet from his election in 987 until his death. He succeeded the last Carolingian king, Louis V of France.

The surname of Lecapitaine or LeCaptain is derived from the Belgian municipality of Grez-Doiceau in the province of Walloon Brabant, the birthplace of many Capetian Royalty and from multiple places around France, especially Paris, pertaining to the Capetian Dynasty. The name later reached North America and can be found with particular density in Wisconsin, as well as Africa.

References

Surnames